NDrive is a Portuguese company of global automotive navigation systems for mobile phones and tablets. The company was founded in 2001 and is headquartered in Porto, Portugal. It became one of the first companies to offer navigation for Android and iPhone and the first GPS navigation for Bada and WebOS.

History 
The company was founded in 2001 by Eduardo Carqueja.

See also 
 Point of Interest
 Comparison of commercial GPS software
 Garmin

References

External links 
 Official site

Navigation system companies
Portuguese brands